Shelly Beach is a coastal suburb of the Central Coast region of New South Wales, Australia, located east of Tuggerah Lake and bordering the Pacific Ocean south of The Entrance. It is part of the  local government area. It is 66 km south of Newcastle & 93 km north of Sydney.  Shelly Beach is considered one of the most popular surfing beaches on the Central Coast.

Shelly Beach Golf Club (previously Tuggerah Lakes Gold Club) is an 18-hole golf course located at the eastern end of Shelly Beach Road, overlooking Shelly Beach. It was formally established in 1930, originally being located at Killarney Vale until 1954 when it moved to its present location.

Within the suburb there is the Shelly Beach Surf Club and the Shelly Beach Fossils soccer club.

Transportation
 Red Bus Services operates routes through Shelly Beach (11, 12, 21, 22, 23).  Bus 21 operates from The Entrance North to Gosford regularly.

Notable people

 Nikki Garrett – golfer
Banjo Paterson – poet

Accommodation
 Shelly Beach Cabins
 Bluewater Resort
 Sun Valley Tourist Park

References

External links
 http://www.shellybeachsurfclub.com

Suburbs of the Central Coast (New South Wales)